Jerome Xavier Walcott FRCS (born April 2, 1957) is a Barbadian diplomat and politician currently serving as foreign minister of Barbados.

Biography 
Walcott was raised in Bridgetown and was educated at St. Angela's Primary and also studied at London Business School. He graduated from University of the West Indies in 1982 and is a fellow of the Royal College of Surgeons.

Walcott was MP between 2003 and 2008, and since 2001 was Leader of Government Business in the Senate and later served as minister of health under the tenure of Owen Arthur. Between 1995 and 1997, he served as Assistant Secretary of the Labour Party and has been its chairman as of 2021. He was also appointed as a senator in 2013.

Since May 27, 2018, he has been the minister of foreign affairs of Barbados under prime minister Mia Mottley.

References 

1957 births
Living people
Barbados Labour Party politicians
Members of the Senate of Barbados
University of the West Indies alumni
Alumni of the University of London
Foreign Ministers of Barbados
Health ministers of Barbados
Fellows of the Royal College of Surgeons